The Sanctuary of the Madonna del Carmine, also called for short Santuario del Carmine is a 19th-century Roman Catholic church located in the town of Riccia, Province of Campobasso in the region of Molise, Italy.

History 
The Carmelite order had established themselves in Riccia by 1238, and remained till this small convent was suppressed by Pope Innocent X in 1653. Medieval frescoes decorated the church that had existed at the site prior the present structure, however, it was rebuilt and refurbished over the centuries, eliminating the early decoration. By the early 1500s, it had become a site for devotion to the Vergine del Carmelo (Our Lady of Mount Carmel). In 1863–1864, the ancient church was razed and rebuilt in an octagonal layout.

An inscription on the portal recalls that the church was rebuilt in gratitude to the ebbing of the 1854 cholera epidemic. The interior has a triptych depicting a Madonna and the prophets Elias and Eliseo. Below are saints John the Baptist, Michael, and Albert.

The church contains the statue of the Crowned Madonna of the Carmine and Child with Multiple Cherubs in Clouds, which is paraded through town during festivities was replaced by a work of L. Caputo, after the original burned during a fire before 1903. Every mid-July, this statue of the Madonna is paraded through the street and brought back to the church.

The church had two altars lateral to the main altar, one dedicated to Santa Filomena, the other to St Gregory.

References 

Roman Catholic churches in Riccia
19th-century Roman Catholic church buildings in Italy
Octagonal churches in Italy
Roman Catholic churches completed in 1864
Neoclassical church buildings in Italy
Riccia, Molise